The 1927 Minnesota Golden Gophers football team represented the University of Minnesota in the 1927 Big Ten Conference football season. In their third year under head coach Clarence Spears, the Golden Gophers compiled a 6–0–2 record and outscored their opponents by a combined score of 209 to 51. The Gophers shared the Big Ten title, the ninth in school history. The team was ranked No. 3 in the nation in the Dickinson System ratings released in December 1927.

Fullback Herb Joesting and guard Harold Hanson were named All-American status by the Associated Press. Joesting, Hanson, quarterback Harold "Shorty" Almquist, tackle Mike Gary and end Ken Haycraft were named All-Big Ten first team.

Total attendance for the season was 166,848, which averaged to 23,126. The season high for attendance was against Wisconsin.

Schedule

Game summaries

Michigan

On November 19, 1927, Minnesota defeated Michigan by a 13-7 score at Michigan Stadium. Bennie Oosterbaan scored Michigan's touchdown in the first quarter on a long forward pass from halfback William Puckelwartz, and Louis Gilbert kicked the point after touchdown. Minnesota came from behind with 13 points in the second half on touchdown runs by Herb Joesting and a touchdown pass from Harold "Shorty" Almquist to Haycraft. Minnesota had 15 first downs in the game while Michigan had only two. Minnesota's victory was its first over Michigan since 1919. The game was also the Michigan's first defeat at Michigan Stadium and the final college football game for Michigan stars Oosterbaan and Gilbert and for Minnesota stars Joesting and Almquist. Walter Eckersall served as the game's referee and wrote in the Chicago Tribune: "For hard, aggressive playing combined with splendid sportsmanship it was one of the best struggles I ever officiated in."

References

Minnesota
Minnesota Golden Gophers football seasons
Big Ten Conference football champion seasons
College football undefeated seasons
Minnesota Golden Gophers football